Manchester Mesivta School is a Jewish secondary school for boys located in Prestwich in the English county of Greater Manchester.

It is a voluntary aided school administered by Bury Metropolitan Borough Council, but admits Orthodox Jewish boys aged 11 to 16 from all over Greater Manchester. Previously a private school, Manchester Mesivta School became voluntary-aided in 2004 and relocated to new buildings in 2005.

Manchester Mesivta School operates principally as a mesivta for pupils who wish to proceed eventually to a yeshiva, and therefore aims for pupils to achieve a high degree of proficiency in Torah studies. The school offers a Yeshiva-orientated Torah syllabus along with the National Curriculum. Secular studies lead to GCSE courses and examinations. There is also an independent sixth form provision attached to the school site.

References

External links
 

Boys' schools in Greater Manchester
Jewish schools in England
Mesivtas
Orthodox Jewish educational institutions
Orthodox Judaism in England
Secondary schools in the Metropolitan Borough of Bury
Voluntary aided schools in England